The Ceraphronoidea are a small hymenopteran superfamily that includes only two families, and a total of some 800 species, though a great many species are still undescribed. It is a poorly known group as a whole, and most are believed to be parasitoid or hyperparasitoids.

The two families are unified by several characters, the most visible of which is their wing venation is greatly reduced in a very specific and unique way; the costal and radial veins have fused so no costal cell is present, a short break occurs at the stigma, and the only vein in the wing membrane itself is the radial sector, which is short and curved, arising from the stigma.
The taxon was erected by Alexander Henry Haliday.
 
Some fossil families that were formerly assigned to this group have since been reassigned elsewhere including Aptenoperissidae, Radiophronidae and Stigmaphronidae.

References

Dessart, P. & Cancemi, P. 1987. Tableau dichotomique des genres de Ceraphronoidea (Hymenoptera) avec commentaires et nouvelles especies. Frustula Entomologica 7-8: 307–372.
Johnson, N. F. & L. Musetti. 2004. Catalog of the systematic literature of the superfamily Ceraphronoidea (Hymenoptera). Contributions of the American Entomological Institute 33 (2): 1–149.

External links

Hymatol  Phylogenetics

 
Apocrita superfamilies
Taxa named by Alexander Henry Haliday